is a Japanese actor who was represented by Box Corporation.

Biography
When participating a three-year open campus in high school in Tokyo, Nanba received a scout from his former office.

On 2010, his acting debut was in Kamen Rider W.

On 2011, Nanba appeared on the stage show, Musical Nintama Rantarō as Senzo Tachibana starting from the second series. He appeared in the third installment of the same work, and appeared for three years until the fourth series.

Nanba's hobbies are jogging and watching films and his skills are kendo, calligraphy, backflips, and handstands. He did kendo in elementary school in two years to high school in three years.

Up until the first half of 2018, Nanba was still active in the entertainment industry. After February 2018, nothing has been heard from him ever since. His profile was subsequently removed from the Box Corporation website.

Filmography

Stage

Drama

Variety series

Films

Video game

References

External links
 

21st-century Japanese male actors
1991 births
Living people
People from Okayama Prefecture